Ramo Stott (April 6, 1934 – August 19, 2021) was an American stock car racing driver from Keokuk, Iowa. He competed in NASCAR Winston Cup, USAC stock car, and ARCA. He was a 2011 inductee in the National Dirt Late Model Hall of Fame.

Career

Stott was one of a large group of national drivers from Keokuk, Iowa.

ARCA
Stott won his first ARCA race in 1969 at Crown Point Speedway (Indiana).

Stott was the ARCA champion in 1970 and 1971. His ARCA career stretched from the 1950s to 1990s. Stott won 27 ARCA races in his career, which placed him seventh on the series all-time wins at his time of death. Stott's final ARCA victory came in 1988 at Hazard, Kentucky.

USAC
Stott competed in USAC's stock car division, finishing second in 1973, 1976, and 1977, first in 1975, and third in 1974.

NASCAR
Stott's greatest NASCAR accomplishment was starting from the pole for the 1976 Daytona 500.  He was awarded the pole after the front-row starters, Darrell Waltrip and A. J. Foyt along with Dave Marcis, were disqualified for illegal engines. He raced part-time in 35 starts between 1967 and 1984 along with leading 10 races. His highest career finish was second at Talladega. In the Daytona 500, Stott scored his best finish of third in 1974, two Top-5s, and four Top-10's. In his overall NASCAR career, he had five Top-5s and 17 Top-10s.

Life after racing
He farmed corn and beans during his racing career. Stott became a NASCAR official and drove the NASCAR pace car.

Family life
Stott's sons Lance and Corrie both drove in ARCA before working in the racing industry. Stott was married to his wife Judy for 66 years; she helped repairing cars in his garage and attended his races. He also had two daughters.

Legacy
At the July 2021 race, ARCA honored former champions from Iowa at Iowa Speedway. He was honored along with fellow Keokuk driver Ron Hutcherson, Mason Mitchell, and team owner Larry Clement.

Stott was inducted in the National Dirt Late Model Hall of Fame in 2011.

Death
Stott died on August 19, 2021 from cancer.

References

External links

The Stott Family Racing team

1934 births
2021 deaths
People from Keokuk, Iowa
Racing drivers from Iowa
NASCAR drivers
ARCA Menards Series drivers
People from Kahoka, Missouri
USAC Stock Car drivers